The Seminario de Lima or Seminary of Lima Santo Toribio de Mogrovejo (founded 7 December 1590) is the major seminary for the Roman Catholic Archdiocese of Lima and provides training for those studying for the priesthood. Headquartered in Lima, Peru, it can be considered one of the oldest seminaries on the American continent; it was founded on December 7, 1590, by Archbishop Toribio de Mogrovejo.

The seminary receives young people who want to be priests. Priests graduating from the seminary serve the Roman Catholic Church under the jurisdiction of the Archbishop.

Infrastructure and organization
The seminary includes several structures, including several chapels–Chapel of the Seminar, Chapel San José, Chapel of Saint John Maria Vianney, and the central chapel, as well as several libraries including one for history, philosophy and theology.

The seminary is under the jurisdiction of the Archbishop of Lima, Cardinal Juan Luis Cipriani. Its rector is José Luis Méndez Jiménez, and its spiritual leaders are Javier Pereda Peña and Alfredo Pérez Bustillo.

Catholic Church in Peru
Religious organizations established in the 1590s
Religious buildings and structures completed in 1591
Seminaries and theological colleges in Peru
Catholic seminaries
Spanish Colonial architecture in Peru
Education in Lima
Buildings and structures in Lima